Yamal-101 was a geostationary communications satellite operated by Gazprom Space Systems and built by RSC Energia. It was, along with Yamal-102 the first communications satellite of the Yamal programme and the first iteration of the USP Bus. It was a  satellite with 2200 watts of power (1300 watts available for the payload) on an unpressurized bus. It had eight SPT-70 electric thrusters by OKB Fakel for station keeping. Its payload was 12 C-band equivalent transponders supplied by Space Systems/Loral.

History 
It was launched along Yamal-102, on 6 September 1999 at 16:36:00 UTC from Baikonur Site 81/23 by a Proton-K / Blok DM-2M directly to geostationary orbit. But a failure in the electrical system at solar panel deployment meant that it was lost right after the successful launch.

Rename of Yamal-102 
After Yamal-101 failure, Gazprom Space Systems registered Yamal-102 as Yamal-101. This has caused significant confusion but the records are clear that the satellite that failed was, in fact, the original Yamal-101. Insurance paid US$50 million for the failure.

See also 

 Yamal-102 – Twin satellite that was launched together and ended up commissioned into service with the Yamal-101 registration
 Yamal – Communication satellite family operated by Gazprom Space Systems
 Gazprom Space Systems – Satellite communication division of the Russian oil giant Gazprom
 USP Bus – The satellite bus on which Yamal-101 is based
 RSC Energia – The designer and manufacturer of the Yamal-101 satellite

References

External links 
 Gunter Space Page on the Yamal 101/102

Yamal-101
Spacecraft launched in 1999
Satellites using the USP bus
1999 in Russia
Spacecraft launched by Proton rockets